Cloquet Carlton County Airport  is a county-owned public-use airport located three nautical miles (6 km) southwest of the central business district of Cloquet, a city in Carlton County, Minnesota, United States.

Although most U.S. airports use the same three-letter location identifier for the FAA and IATA, this airport is assigned COQ by the FAA but has no designation from the IATA (which assigned COQ to Choibalsan Airport in Choibalsan, Mongolia).

Facilities and aircraft 
It has two asphalt paved runways: 17/35 is 4,003 by 75 feet (1,220 x 23 m) and 7/25 is 3,100 by 75 feet (945 x 23 m).

For the 12-month period ending April 30, 2005, the airport had 10,000 aircraft operations, an average of 27 per day: 99% general aviation and 1% military. At that time there were 51 aircraft based at this airport: 98% single-engine and 2% ultralight.

References

External links 
 Cloquet Airport
  at Minnesota DOT Airport Directory
 

Airports in Minnesota
Transportation in Carlton County, Minnesota
Buildings and structures in Carlton County, Minnesota